The Cat's Quizzer is a children's book written and illustrated by Theodor Geisel under the pen name Dr. Seuss and published by Random House on August 12, 1976. In March 2021, the book was withdrawn from publication by Dr. Seuss Enterprises.

Plot
In the beginning of the book, the Cat in the Hat introduces the reader to Ziggy and Zizzy Zozzfozzel, saying that they both got 100%, but got every answer wrong, and then asks the reader the recurring question "are you smarter than a Zozzfozzel"? The questions in the book range from simple queries to questions difficult enough to wear the Cat out.

Withdrawal
On March 2, 2021, Dr. Seuss Enterprises withdrew The Cat's Quizzer and five other books from publication due to the inclusion of imagery they deem "hurtful and wrong". The apparent reason for the book's withdrawal from publication is an illustration (on page 11) of a yellow figure in a coolie hat with the caption, "How old do you have to be to be a Japanese?" 

Removing the books caused a surge in sales for other works by Seuss that impacted Amazon's charts in the United States. It was reported by CTV News that nine of the top ten best sellers were all books by Seuss, excluding the books that were removed. As the collectors' value of the withdrawn books rose substantially, eBay also delisted the books.

See also
 The Cat in the Hat, original 1957 book

References

American picture books
Books by Dr. Seuss
1976 children's books
Books about cats
Puzzle books
Random House books
The Cat in the Hat
Race-related controversies in literature
Stereotypes of East Asian people
Stereotypes of Hispanic and Latino people